The Prices and Incomes Act 1966 c. 33 was a United Kingdom Act of Parliament, affecting UK labour law, regarding wage levels and price policies. It allowed the government to begin a process to scrutinise rising levels of wages (at around 8 per cent per annum at that time) by initiating reports, and inquiries, and ultimately giving orders for a standstill. The objective was to control inflation. It proved unpopular after the 1960s.

See also
UK labour law
National Board for Prices and Incomes

United Kingdom labour law
United Kingdom Acts of Parliament 1966